Elliot Lamonte Perry (born March 28, 1969) is an American former professional basketball player.

The 6'0" (1.83 m) point guard from Memphis State University (now the University of Memphis), was selected with the tenth pick of the second round (37th overall) by the Los Angeles Clippers in the 1991 NBA Draft. He played ten games in 1991-92 for the Clippers before being waived and subsequently signed for the rest of the season by the Charlotte Hornets. He then moved on to Continental Basketball Association for two years before returning to the NBA with the Phoenix Suns where in 1994-95 he was voted runner-up as the NBA's Most Improved Player.

He rounded out his NBA career in 2002 with his hometown Memphis Grizzlies for whom he played just two games after signing a 10-day contract. He scored 11 points in the 2 games.

Perry is also known as "Socks" because of the high long socks he wore during his college and NBA career. A quick and slashing player in college, his ability to alter his shot in mid-air to draw a foul from his defender made him very dangerous to defend. Lack of quality supporting players forced Perry to carry the U of M team on his skill. During his senior year Penny Hardaway had been scheduled to be his teammate, but Hardaway's academic qualifying woes ensured he was red-shirted, and these two never were able to team up.

After basketball 

Perry and fellow former NBA player and Memphis State alumn Hank McDowell became the radio broadcast team's color commentators for the Memphis Grizzlies  starting in the 2006-07 NBA season. Today, Perry lives in Germantown, TN, a suburb of Memphis. He and his wife have a child together. He still loves to play basketball with former players and kids in his neighborhood, and is active as a mentor with the Boys and Girls Club of Greater Memphis. He is a member of Kappa Alpha Psi fraternity.

He is a minority share owner of the Memphis Grizzlies.

Career statistics

NBA

Regular season

|-
| align="left" | 1991–92
| align="left" | Los Angeles
| 10 || 0 || 6.6 || .400 || .000 || .500 || 0.7 || 1.4 || 0.9 || 0.1 || 1.3
|-
| align="left" | 1991–92
| align="left" | Charlotte
| 40 || 0 || 9.3 || .377 || .200 || .667 || 0.8 || 1.6 || 0.6 || 0.1 || 2.8
|-
| align="left" | 1993–94
| align="left" | Phoenix
| 27 || 9 || 16.0 || .372 || .000 || .750 || 1.4 || 4.6 || 0.9 || 0.0 || 3.9
|-
| align="left" | 1994–95
| align="left" | Phoenix
| style="background:#cfecec;" | 82* || 51 || 24.1 || .520 || .417 || .810 || 1.8 || 4.8 || 1.9 || 0.0 || 9.7
|-
| align="left" | 1995–96
| align="left" | Phoenix
| 81 || 26 || 20.6 || .475 || .407 || .778 || 1.7 || 4.4 || 1.1 || 0.1 || 8.6
|-
| align="left" | 1996–97
| align="left" | Milwaukee
| 82 || 3 || 19.5 || .474 || .358 || .745 || 1.5 || 3.0 || 1.2 || 0.0 || 6.9
|-
| align="left" | 1997–98
| align="left" | Milwaukee
| 81 || 33 || 21.6 || .430 || .340 || .844 || 1.3 || 2.8 || 1.1 || 0.0 || 7.3
|-
| align="left" | 1998–99
| align="left" | Milwaukee
| 5 || 0 || 9.4 || .529 || 1.000 || .500 || 1.6 || 2.4 || 0.8 || 0.0 || 4.0
|-
| align="left" | 1998–99
| align="left" | New Jersey
| 30 || 0 || 8.1 || .349 || .391 || .750 || 0.9 || 1.2 || 0.5 || 0.0 || 2.6
|-
| align="left" | 1999–00
| align="left" | New Jersey
| 60 || 5 || 13.4 || .435 || .282 || .806 || 1.0 || 2.3 || 0.7 || 0.0 || 5.3
|-
| align="left" | 2000–01
| align="left" | Orlando
| 6 || 0 || 6.5 || .455 || .000 || .000 || 0.7 || 0.8 || 0.5 || 0.0 || 1.7
|-
| align="left" | 2000–01
| align="left" | Phoenix
| 43 || 6 || 10.7 || .465 || .250 || .727 || 1.0 || 1.7 || 0.4 || 0.0 || 3.2
|-
| align="left" | 2001–02
| align="left" | Memphis
| 2 || 0 || 24.0 || .500 || .000 || .500 || 2.0 || 3.5 || 1.5 || 0.0 || 5.5
|- class="sortbottom"
| style="text-align:center;" colspan="2"| Career
| 549 || 133 || 17.3 || .459 || .359 || .783 || 1.4 || 3.1 || 1.0 || 0.0 || 6.3
|}

Playoffs

|-
| align="left" | 1993–94
| align="left" | Phoenix
| 4 || 0 || 3.3 || .143 || .000 || .000 || 0.0 || 0.3 || 0.3 || 0.0 || 0.5
|-
| align="left" | 1994–95
| align="left" | Phoenix
| 9 || 0 || 11.8 || .476 || .400 || .800 || 1.1 || 1.3 || 0.6 || 0.0 || 6.9
|-
| align="left" | 1995–96
| align="left" | Phoenix
| 4 || 0 || 12.8 || .500 || .000 || .000 || 0.5 || 3.0 || 0.5 || 0.0 || 3.5
|-
| align="left" | 2000–01
| align="left" | Phoenix
| 2 || 0 || 8.5 || .600 || .000 || 1.000 || 2.0 || 2.0 || 1.0 || 0.0 || 6.5
|- class="sortbottom"
| style="text-align:center;" colspan="2"| Career
| 19 || 0 || 9.8 || .466 || .333 || .778 || 0.8 || 1.5 || 0.5 || 0.0 || 4.8
|}

College

|-
| align="left" | 1987–88
| align="left" | Memphis
| 32 || 32 || 30.3 || .417 || .390 || .806 || 3.5 || 4.1 || 2.2 || 0.2 || 13.1
|-
| align="left" | 1988–89
| align="left" | Memphis
| 32 || 32 || 31.8 || .462 || .316 || .821 || 3.4 || 3.7 || 2.1 || 0.0 || 19.4
|-
| align="left" | 1989–90
| align="left" | Memphis
| 30 || - || 32.3 || .418 || .258 || .753 || 3.7 || 5.0 || 2.7 || 0.2 || 16.8
|-
| align="left" | 1990–91
| align="left" | Memphis
| 32 || - || 36.5 || .464 || .360 || .793 || 3.5 || 4.6 || 2.7 || 0.0 || 20.8
|- class="sortbottom"
| style="text-align:center;" colspan="2"| Career
| 126 || 64 || 32.7 || .443 || .345 || .794 || 3.5 || 4.3 || 2.4 || 0.1 || 17.5
|}

References

External links
Elliot Perry bio, NBA.com
Career college & NBA stats @ basketballreference.com
College Stats

1969 births
Living people
American art collectors
African-American basketball players
American broadcasters
American men's basketball players
Basketball players from Memphis, Tennessee
Charlotte Hornets players
Grand Rapids Hoops players
La Crosse Catbirds players
Los Angeles Clippers draft picks
Los Angeles Clippers players
McDonald's High School All-Americans
Memphis Grizzlies players
Memphis Grizzlies announcers
Memphis Tigers men's basketball players
Milwaukee Bucks players
New Jersey Nets players
Orlando Magic players
People from Germantown, Tennessee
Phoenix Suns players
Point guards
Rochester Renegade players
United States men's national basketball team players
21st-century African-American people
20th-century African-American sportspeople